Koiak 6 - Coptic Calendar - Koiak 8 

The seventh day of the Coptic month of Koiak, the fourth month of the Coptic year. On a common year, this day corresponds to December 3, of the Julian Calendar, and December 16, of the Gregorian Calendar. This day falls in the Coptic season of Peret, the season of emergence. This day falls in the Nativity Fast.

Commemorations

Saints 

 The martyrdom of Saints Banina and Banawa 
 The martyrdom of Saint Said Ibn Kateb El-Faraghany, the Distinguished Coptic Engineer 
 The departure of Saint John the Bishop of Armant 
 The departure of Saint Matthew the Poor, also known as the Potter

Other commemorations 

 The consecration of the Church of Saint Episkharion of Qelin

References 

Days of the Coptic calendar